Soheir (and its variant Soher) is an Arabic feminine given name. People with the name include:

 Soher Al Bably (1937–2021), Egyptian actress
 Soheir Khashoggi (born 1947), Saudi Arabian writer
 Soheir Ramzi (born 1950), Egyptian actress
 Soheir Zaki (born 1945), Egyptian belly dancer and actress

Arabic words and phrases
Arabic feminine given names